The British Rail Class 801 Azuma is a type of electric multiple unit (EMU) built by Hitachi Rail for London North Eastern Railway. The units have been built since 2017 at Hitachi's Newton Aycliffe Manufacturing Facility and have been used on services on the East Coast Main Line since 16 September 2019. As part of its production, the Class 801 units were ordered as part of the Intercity Express Programme and are in the Hitachi AT300 product family, alongside the closely related Class 800 units. LNER have branded the units as the Azuma, just like on their Class 800 units.

Background and design

As part of the UK Government's Intercity Express Programme, the Class 801 units were to be built as replacements for the InterCity 125 and InterCity 225 sets which were the main trains used for services on the Great Western Main Line (GWML) and the East Coast Main Line (ECML) at the time. Differing from  the Class 800 units, which they were built alongside, the Class 801 units were designed as purely electric multiple units, but with one diesel engine fitted to a single coach of each unit for emergency use. The Class 801 units were to enter service for both Great Western Railway and London North Eastern Railway but due to delays in the electrification of the GWML, it was announced in June 2016 that 21 nine-car (801/0) sets that were going to enter service with GWR would instead be converted to bi-modal operation. As a consequence, all of these sets were re-classified as 800/3 units and the Class 801 units will only see operation on the ECML. However, GWR do have the option to convert all of their Class 800 units to electric-only operation by removal of the diesel engines should it be exercised, in which case they would be re-classified as a Class 801 unit.

Operation 

The Class 801 units first entered service on 16 September 2019 with LNER, which were two five-car 801/1 units that were doubled up to make a ten-car train. 801109 and 801110 were the units, having started and finished their diagram at Leeds.

Following this shortly were the nine-car 801/2 sets, with two units (801205 and 801207) entering service on 18 November 2019 onto the London King's Cross - Edinburgh route.

Fleet details

References

Notes

External links

 Official Website, Hitachi

High-speed trains of the United Kingdom
Hitachi multiple units
Train-related introductions in 2019
25 kV AC multiple units